Cabeza de Vaca is an archaeological site in Peru. It is located in the Tumbes Region, Tumbes Province, Corrales District. Cabeza de Vaca was occupied by Incas. The ruins consisting of buildings, temples, canals and trail. The site is 5 kilometres from Tumbes, Peru.

Its image was used on a commemorative 1 Sol coin in 2016, to represent the Tumbes Region, part of a series titled "Wealth and Pride of Peru".

References

Archaeological sites in Peru